Passera is a surname. Notable people with the surname include:
Camillo Passera (1965), former Italian racing cyclist
Corrado Passera  (1954), Italian manager and banker
José Passera  (1915–1990), Argentine former sports shooter

Italian-language surnames
Surnames from nicknames